This is a list of programs previously aired by the now-defunct TV network, AksyonTV and 5 Plus. For the currently aired shows on One Sports, please see the List of programs broadcast by One Sports.

Local defunct shows

Newscasts
 Aksyon (2011–2019)
Aksyon Breaking (2011–2014)
Aksyon JournalisMO (2011–2012)
Aksyon Linggo (2011–2012)
Aksyon sa Umaga (2014–2017)
Aksyon Sabado (2011–2012)
Aksyon Weather (2011–2014)
Aksyon Weekend (2013–2014)
Aksyon Tonite (2014–2019)
Andar ng mga Balita (2011–2014)
Balitaang Tapat (2011–2012)
Balitang 60 (2011–2014)
CNN Konek (2011–2013)
Good Morning Club (2012–2014)
Pilipinas News (2012–2014)
Pilipinas News Weekend (2012–2014)
Sapul sa Singko (2011–2012)

Documentaries and public affairs
Ako Mismo (2011)
Alagang Kapatid (2011–2014)
Anggulo (2011–2012)
Balwarte (2013)
Bigtime (2014)
Bitag (2011–2012)
Buhay OFW (2011–2019)
Chicken Talk (2019)
Crime Klasik (2011–2013)
Dayo (2013–2014)
Dokumentado (2011–2013)
Dong Puno De Kalibre (2011–2013) (formerly titled "Kalibre 41")
Duelo: Barilan ng Opinyon (2011–2012)
Insider (2012)
Journo (2011–2012)
Juan Direction (2013–2014)
News5 Debates: Hamon sa Pagbabago (2011)
News5 Imbestigasyon (2012)
Pinoy U.S. Cops: Ride Along (2011–2012)
Presinto 5 (2011–2013)
Public Atorni: Asunto o Areglo (2011–2012)
Reaksyon Weekend (2012)
Rescue5 (2013)
Talking Heads (2019)
Tayuan Mo at Panindigan (2011–2012)
Teknotrip (2011)
Totoo TV (2011)
Tutok Tulfo (2011–2012)
USI: Under Special Investigation (2011–2012)
Wanted (2011–2012)
Wasak (2011–2013)

E-sports
GGNetwork.TV (2019–2020)
One Up (2019–2020)

Infotainment
Astig! (5 minute segment) (2012–2013)
Bilang Tao (2011–2012)
Political Intel (2012)

Informercials
EZ Shop (2016–2019, 2020–2021)
Shop TV (2016, 2017–2018)
Shop Japan (2015–2017)

Lifestyle 
Chef vs. Mom (2012–2013)
Cocktales (2011–2013)
Cooking Na! (2011–2012)
It's More Fun with Philip (2013)

Reality
Juan Direction (2013–2014)

Radyo5 programs 
Aksyon Solusyon (2011–2013, 2014–2019)
Aksyon Sports (2011, 2014–2019)
Alagang Kapatid (2015–2016, 2017–2019)
Alertado (2011–2012)
Andar ng mga Balita (2011–2012)
Balita Alas-Singko sa Radyo5 (2011–2019)
Bitag Live (2012–2017; moved to PTV 4)
Boljak (2018–2019)
Chink Positive (2011–2019)
Cristy Ferminute (2012–2019)
Healing Galing (2012–2019)
Healthline (2014–2016)
Iba 'Yung Pinoy (2017–2019)
Joe d' Mango's Love Notes (2012–2013)
Love Idols (2011, 2017–2019)
Magbago Tayo (2011–2016)
Metro Sabado (2011–2016, 2017–2019)
Manila sa Umaga (2012–2013)
Morning Calls (2012–2013, 2018–2019)
Orly at Laila: All Ready! (2018–2019)
Orly Mercado: All Ready (2018–2019)
Oplan Asenso (2011–2012, 2016–2019)
Patol: Republika ni Arnelli (2011–2012)
Perfect Morning (2011–2017, 2018–2019)
Power and Play (2018–2019)
Punto Asintado (2011–2016, 2017)
Relasyon (2012–2019)
Remoto Control (2012–2013, 2015–2017)
Serbisyong Kapatid (2017–2019)
Tulong Ko Pasa Mo (2017)
Wanted sa Radyo (2011–2019)
Todo Bigay (2011–2013)
Trabaho Lang! (2012–2013, 2016)

Religious
Sunday TV Mass (2020)
Word of God Network (2018–2019)

Sports-oriented programs
National Basketball Training Center League (NBTC) (2019)
Play is Work (2019–2020)
PBA Greatest Games (2020–2021)
Sportspage (2020–2021)
X Games (2019–2020)

Acquired and foreign programs

U.S. TV series
Blindspot
Arrow
Supergirl
Supernatural
Prison Break

Boxing
Boxing's Greatest Fights (2020–2021)

Collegiate sports
NCAA Men's Basketball (2019–2021)
NCAA Men's Gymnastics (2019)
NCAA Men's Ice Hockey (2019)
NCAA Women's Basketball (2019)
NCAA Women's Gymnastics (2019)
NCAA Women's Swimming (2019)
NCAA Women's Volleyball (2019)

E-sports
eGG Network (2019–2020)
Road to The Nationals (2019–2021)

Auto racing
NASCAR Cup Series (2020)
NASCAR Xfinity Series (2020)
World Rally Championship (2020)
FIA ABB Formula E Championship (2020)

Mixed martial arts
UFC Fight Night (2020–2021)

Sports-oriented programs
Around the Horn (2019–2020)
Pardon the Interruption (2019–2020)

Election coverage specials
Pagbabago 2013
Bilang Pilipino 2016

as TV5

Sports shows/coverage
2013 FIBA Americas Championship (September 2013)
2013 FIBA Asia Championship (August 1–11, 2013)
2013 FIBA EuroBasket Championship (September 2013)
2013 AIBA World Boxing Championship (October 2013)
2013 PBA Annual Leo Awards (October 18, 2013)
2014 Winter Olympics (February 8–24, 2014)
2014 PLDT HOME Fibr Asian Men's Club Volleyball Championship (April 8–16, 2014)
2014 Incheon Asian Games (September 19 – October 4, 2014)
2016 Rio Olympics (August 6–22, 2016)
2018 Winter Olympics (February 9–25, 2018)
2018 William Jones Cup (July 14–22, 2018)
2018 Jakarta-Palembang Asian Games (August 18 – September 2, 2018)
2018 Copa Paulino Alcantara Finals (October 27, 2018)
2019 Southeast Asian Games 
2019 FIBA Basketball World Cup 
2020 Tokyo Olympics 
2022 FIBA Asia Cup 
2021 Asian Women's Club Volleyball Championship 
2021 Asian Men's Club Volleyball Championship 
2021 Copa Paulino Alcantara  
2022 Winter Olympics 
2021 Southeast Asian Games 
2022 AFF Women's Championship 
2022 Asian Women's Volleyball Cup  
2022 FIBA Women's Basketball World Cup 
30 for 30 
Bigtime Bakbakan (2011; 2013)
Bernard Hopkins vs. Karo Murat Fight (October 27, 2013)
Andre Ward vs. Edwin Rodriguez Fight (November 17, 2013)
Zeb Judah vs. Paulie Malignaggi Fight (December 8, 2013)
BWF Badminton (July 2013)
Davis Cup (2011)
Fight for Peace: World Muaythai Championship (October 27, 2013)
Glory Kickboxing (2019-2020)
 Formula E 
National Cheerleading Championship (NCC) 
NCAA (Men's Basketball) on AksyonTV
NCAA Women's Beach Volleyball Finals (March 1, 2014)
NCAA Men's Football Finals (February 24, 2014)
NCAA March Madness (March 19 – April 8, 2014)
2014 NCAA March Madness Finals: Connecticut Huskies vs. Kentucky Wildcats (April 8, 2014)
 NFL on One Sports (-)
NFL Super Bowl XLVIII (February 3, 2014)
Pacific Xtreme Combat 
PXC 39 (September 15, 2013)
PXC 41 (November 10, 2013)
Philippine Badminton Ranking System (PBaRS) Invitationals (2013)
 Philippine Premier League 
Philippine Secondary Schools Basketball Championship
PBA on Sports5 (2013-2015)
PBA D-League (2013)
PBA D-League Aspirant's Cup Finals: NLEX vs. Big Chill (February 24 and 27, 2014)
Philippine Super Liga (2015-2020)
The Return of the Hurricane (Julaton vs. Alcanter) (2011)¹
Super Bowl LIV 
UAAP Cheerdance Competition 2014 (September 14, 2014)
The United Football League (2013-2016)
WNCAA Cheerdance Competition (February 9, 2014)
WNCAA Highlights (2013–2014)

Special coverages/TV specials
Lima sa 2013 kasama si Luchi Cruz-Valdes (December 31, 2013)
Pilipinas News 365: Countdown to 2014 (December 31, 2013)
Sinulog Festival (2012–2014)

References

See also
List of programs broadcast by One Sports
AksyonTV
5 Plus

AksyonTV original programming
Lists of television series by network